Panaspis wilsoni, also known commonly as Wilson's dwarf skink and Wilson's snake-eyed skink, is a species of lidless skink, a lizard in the family Scincidae. The species is endemic to Sudan.

Etymology
The specific name, wilsoni, is in honor of Arnold Talbot Wilson, who was a British military officer, diplomat, and amateur naturalist.

Geographic range
P. wilsoni is found in southern Sudan.

Habitat
The preferred natural habitat of P. wilsoni is unknown.

Description

Reproduction
The mode of reproduction of P. wilsoni is unknown.

References

Further reading
   (Panaspis wilsoni, new combination).
Werner F (1914). "Über Eidechsen, darunter zwei neue, aus dem Angloägyptischen Sudan". Anzeiger der Kaiserlichen Akademie der Wissenschaften in Wien, Mathematisch-Naturwissenschaftliche Klasse 57 (18): 393–394. (Ablepharus wilsoni, new species). (in German).

Panaspis
Skinks of Africa
Reptiles of Sub-Saharan Africa
Vertebrates of Sudan
Endemic fauna of Sudan
Reptiles described in 1914
Taxa named by Franz Werner